Monclova is an unincorporated community in central Monclova Township, Lucas County, Ohio, United States.  It has a post office with the ZIP code 43542.

History
Monclova was laid out in 1836. A post office has been in operation at Monclova since 1852.

References

Unincorporated communities in Lucas County, Ohio
Unincorporated communities in Ohio